Ly Mizan ( born 16 August 1993) is a Cambodian footballer who plays as a midfielder for  ISI Dangkor Senchey.

International career
He made his debut in a friendly match against Saudi Arabia national football team on 14 January 2017

References

External links
 

1993 births
Living people
Cambodian footballers
Cambodia international footballers
Association football midfielders